The Waldo Block, located in downtown Portland, Oregon, is listed on the National Register of Historic Places.

The building's ground floor houses Mama Mia Trattoria.

See also
 National Register of Historic Places listings in Southwest Portland, Oregon

References

External links

1886 establishments in Oregon
Commercial buildings completed in 1886
Italianate architecture in Oregon
National Register of Historic Places in Portland, Oregon
Southwest Portland, Oregon
Portland Historic Landmarks